A rhetorical question is one for which the questioner does not expect a direct answer: in many cases it may be intended to start a discourse, or as a means of displaying or emphasize the speaker's or author's opinion on a topic. 

A common example is the question "Can't you do anything right?" This question, when posed, is intended not to ask about the listener's ability but rather to insinuate the listener's lack of ability.

Forms

Negative assertions
A rhetorical question may be intended as a challenge. The question is often difficult or impossible to answer. In the example, What have the Romans ever done for us? (Monty Python's Life of Brian) the question functions as a negative assertion. It is intended to mean The Romans have never done anything for us!. When Shakespeare's Mark Antony exclaims: Here was a Caesar! when comes such another? it functions as an assertion that Caesar possesses such rare qualities they may never be seen again. (Julius Caesar, Act 3, scene 2, 257)

Negative assertions may function as positives in sarcastic contexts. For example, in Smoking can lead to lung cancer. Who knew?! the question functions as an assertion that the truth of the statement should have been utterly obvious.

Metaphors
Rhetorical questions are often used as a metaphor for a question already asked. Examples may be found in the song "Maria" from the 1959 Rodgers and Hammerstein musical, The Sound of Music, in which "How do you solve a problem like Maria?" is repeatedly answered with other questions: "How do you catch a cloud and pin it down?", "How do you keep a wave upon the sand?" and "How do you hold a moonbeam in your hand?" These responses assert that a problem like Maria cannot be solved.

In the vernacular, this form of rhetorical question is called "rhetorical affirmation". The certainty or obviousness of the answer to a question is expressed by asking another, often humorous, question for which the answer is equally obvious. Popular examples include "Do bears shit in the woods?", "Is the sky blue?" and "Is the Pope Catholic?"

Punctuation
Depending on the context, a rhetorical question may be punctuated by a question mark (?), full stop (.), or exclamation mark (!), but some sources argue that it is required to use a question mark for any question, rhetorical or not.

In the 1580s, English printer Henry Denham invented a "rhetorical question mark" (⸮) for use at the end of a rhetorical question; however, it fell out of use in the 17th century. It was the reverse of an ordinary question mark, so that instead of the main opening pointing back into the sentence, it opened away from it.

Quotes
"The effectiveness of rhetorical questions in argument  comes from their dramatic quality. They suggest dialogue, especially when the speaker both asks and answers them himself, as if he were playing two parts on the stage. They are not always impassioned; they may be mildly ironical or merely argumentative: but they are always to some extent dramatic, and, if used to excess, they tend to give one’s style a theatrical air."

"Rhetorical questioning is…a fairly conscious technique adopted by a speaker for deliberate ends, and it is used infrequently, proportional to the length of the dialogue, oration, or conversation."

See also
Aporia
Hypothetical question 
Suggestive question
Complex question
Presupposition
Double-barreled question
Loaded question
Implicature
Performative contradiction
Betteridge's law of headlines

Notes

External links
What is a rhetorical question?
Audio illustrations of the rhetorical question
A short definition of the term

Pragmatics
Rhetorical techniques
Types of question